Kit Malone ( 19751976) is an American transgender rights activist and educator active in Indiana. As of June 2022, she serves as Advocacy Strategist at the American Civil Liberties Union Indiana chapter, where she leads the chapter's LGBTQ Rights Project. Malone was formerly Director of Diversity and board member for Indy Pride. As an advocate for transgender and LGBT rights, Malone has campaigned against state laws in Indiana, and is frequently cited as a spokesperson in the media.

Career

Early life 
Malone is from Noblesville, Indiana, where she attended a local high school. She worked as a high school teacher for 20 years without any prior involvement in advocacy.

Malone is also a singer-songwriter who often performs local gigs. In 2006, she was awarded a Cultural Vision Award as Indianapolis's best folk singer by NUVO, a local alternative weekly newspaper.

Malone has stated that she struggled with her gender identity her whole life before deciding she "couldn't function anymore unless she transitioned". After she transitioned, she no longer felt safe using public restrooms, feeling like she had to work to make her appearance fit in with others. She also has said found herself unable to get a job at a Rally's fast food restaurant after the transition.

Malone first got involved in activism in 2015, amid the ongoing public debate around Indiana Religious Freedom Restoration Act, national "bathroom bills", and other laws LGBT advocates viewed as discriminatory. She first worked as a community organizer for the Freedom Indiana campaign, which advocated for the addition of sexual orientation and gender identity to the state anti-discrimination law, and in Indiana municipalities.

Indy Pride 
Malone joined the board of Indy Pride in 2016, and also served as its Director of Diversity. Malone spoke out about diversity on the Indy Pride board, where 16 out of 17 members were white in 2015. At Indy Pride, Malone helped develop #TransGlam, the first Indy Pride-associated event "by and for the trans community". She organized the first transgender marching group in the history of the Indy Pride Parade.

ACLU 
Malone's first position at the ACLU of Indiana, was as their Transgender Education and Advocacy Coordinator. Malone currently serves as Advocacy Strategist, where she leads the organization's LGBTQ Rights Project and Transgender Education and Advocacy Program. In this role, she campaigns for civil rights protections for LGBT people in Indiana, through education and outreach. She also works to identify and develop leaders in the transgender rights movement.

In 2019, she was inducted into Indy Pride's Hall of Fame for this work and in 2020 was named Community Leader of the Year by the Indy Rainbow Chamber of Commerce. In 2021, Malone was awarded a Trailblazer Award for Civic Engagement by the Kennedy King Memorial Initiative.

Personal life 
Malone met her romantic partner, also an activist for transgender rights, while both were working together on advocacy at the Indiana State Legislature. In 2018, Malone authored a humorous self-help guide in McSweeney's with makeup tips for the newly out transgender woman.

References 

1970s births
Living people
Transgender rights activists
American Civil Liberties Union people
LGBT people from Indiana
Transgender women
Year of birth missing (living people)
People from Noblesville, Indiana
American LGBT rights activists
Activists from Indiana
Educators from Indiana
21st-century American women educators
21st-century American educators